Prince Maria Emanuel of Saxony, Duke of Saxony, Margrave of Meissen (31 January 1926 – 23 July 2012) was the head of the Royal House of Saxony.

Life
Born at Prüfening Abbey in Regensburg, Bavaria, he was the eldest child of the then Hereditary Prince Frederick Christian of Saxony, later Margrave of Meissen, and Princess Elisabeth Helene of Thurn and Taxis.

At the age of 18 Emanuel was imprisoned and sentenced to death by the National Socialists for being opposed to their rule. The death sentence, however, was commuted. He next had to escape from the approaching Soviets as his homeland, Saxony, became a part of communist East Germany as World War II wound down. After the war he moved to Switzerland where he began working in the financial services sector. Also being a talented painter Emanuel had a number of his works exhibited.

Although Marie Vassiltchikov recounts in her book The Berlin Diaries 1940–45 the story of the 16-year-old Hereditary Prince Maria Emanuel paying her a visit to seek her help in finding a bride, as he felt it was his dynastic obligation to start a family early, Emanuel would not in fact marry until his 37th birthday. His wife was Princess Anastasia of Anhalt (born 1940), whom he married (civ.) on 22 June 1962 in La Tour-de-Peilz and (rel.) on 31 January 1963 in Vevey, Switzerland. They had no children.

Maria Emanuel became head of the Royal House of Saxony upon the death of his father on 9 August 1968.

Succession
As Maria Emanuel fathered no legitimate children, he had acknowledged as his eventual heir Prince Alexander of Saxe-Gessaphe, the son of his eldest sister Princess Anna and her late husband Robert Afif, Prince of Gessaphe (or "Assaphe"/"Afif-Assaf", descendants of a Lebanese Christian family which ruled the Keserwan, a province in north of Beirut). Maria Emanuel adopted Alexander on 1 June 1999, who had married Princess Gisela of Bavaria in 1987. In 1997 the surviving male dynasts of the Albertine line of Wettins consented to the Margrave's decision, Subsequently, his brother Albert stated that he no longer accepted the decision.

The royal line of the House of Wettin applies semi-salic law, which allows for inheritance through a female. Since the death of Maria Emanuel, if Albert was the last male dynast then this would lead firstly to the children of their sisters Maria Josepha (unmarried), Maria Anna and Mathilde, but only Mathilde's marriage indisputedly met equality requirements and her only son died in 1987. Therefore, if the Gessaphe claim is invalid, the succession would pass to the issue of the Margrave's paternal aunts, who were Margarete Karola (1900–1962), Maria Alix (1901–1990) and Anna (1903–1976), all of whom left children. Margarete having been the eldest, the heir would be her grandson Karl Friedrich, Prince of Hohenzollern (born 1932), head of the princely line of the royal House of Hohenzollern.

The Margrave's brother Albert, however, supported discarding equality requirements to allow his cousin Prince Timo of Saxony's morganatic son, Rüdiger (born 1953), to eventually succeed. Rüdiger has, with his first wife Astrid Linke (1949–1989), three sons Daniel (born 1975), Arne (born 1977) and Nils (born 1978).

Although the Albertine Saxons consist only of the royal branch, there are several extant lines of the House of Wettin which ruled the various Ernestine duchies until 1918 (as well as the cadet branches of the Coburg line which held several royal crowns). In a joint statement of 23 June 2015, the heads of the three remaining branches of the senior Ernestine line of the House of Wettin, Michael, Prince of Saxe-Weimar-Eisenach, Andreas, Prince of Saxe-Coburg and Gotha and Konrad, Prince of Saxe-Meiningen, declared that, according to the house law of the House of Wettin and to traditional princely succession rules, Alexander Afif, bearing the name Prince of Saxony by adoption, were neither a member of nobility nor of the House of Wettin, nor had he succeeded Maria Emanuel as head of the Albertine branch (the Royal House of Saxony), nor were he entitled to style himself Margrave of Meissen.

Ancestry

References

External links
 House Laws of the Kingdom of Saxony 
 Website of his brother Prince Albert of Saxony 
Website of the House of Wettin 

Margraves of Meissen
1926 births
2012 deaths
House of Wettin
Knights of the Golden Fleece of Austria
Saxon princes
People from Regensburg
German Roman Catholics
Albertine branch
Hereditary Princes of Thurn and Taxis
German resistance members
People condemned by Nazi courts
German prisoners sentenced to death
German escapees
Escapees from German detention